2-Nitropropane (2-NP) is a solvent.  It is a colorless liquid and is classified as a nitro compound.

Preparation
2-Nitropropane is produced by the high-temperature vapor-phase nitration of propane, usually with impurities of 1-nitropropane. 2-Nitropropane is also produced as a volatile by-product that can be captured during Leonard's ring-closure hydantoin preparation.

Uses
2-Nitropropane is used as a solvent or additive in inks, paints, adhesives, varnishes, polymers, resins, fuel, and coatings. It is also used as a feedstock for other industrial chemicals, and also in the synthesis of pharmaceuticals such as phentermine, chlorphentermine, and teclozan. It serves as an oxidant in the Hass–Bender oxidation process.

Safety
2-Nitropropane  is a constituent of tobacco smoke. Based on studies in animals, it is reasonably anticipated to be a human carcinogen and it is listed as an IARC Group 2B carcinogen.

References

Nitroalkanes
Nitro solvents
Isopropyl compounds